A one-light is a timed workprint made using a single setting of the three lights (red, green and blue) used to make a color film print. Since a fully timed print requires the presence of a skilled person called a color timer (US) or film grader' (UK), a one-light print is more economical for printing dailies (positive) from rushes (negative).

Cinematographers often require one-light workprints to better judge their film exposures.

Cinematography
Photographic techniques

References